The bokikokiko, Kiritimati reed warbler or Christmas Island warbler (Acrocephalus aequinoctialis) is a species of warbler in the family Acrocephalidae. It is found only on Kiritimati and Washington Island (Kiribati). 

The population size of the bokikokiko is estimated to be around 2500, with a decreasing population trend. The species is under threat from introduced species such as the pig and rat but especially the feral cat and climate change in relation to rising sea levels.

Subspecies
The species may be divided into the following subspecies:

 Acrocephalus aequinoctialis aequinoctialis Latham, 1790
 Acrocephalus aequinoctialis pistor

Gallery

References

External links
 
 
 http://www.birdlife.org/datazone/speciesfactsheet.php?id=7615
 http://ibc.lynxeds.com/species/kiritimati-reed-warbler-acrocephalus-aequinoctialis
 http://thewebsiteofeverything.com/animals/birds/Passeriformes/Sylviidae/Acrocephalus-aequinoctialis

Acrocephalus (bird)
Birds of Micronesia
Endemic fauna of Kiribati
Birds described in 1790
Taxonomy articles created by Polbot